is a Japanese manga artist, best known for his series School Rumble.

Overview

Kobayashi began drawing manga seriously during his university years, and won an honorable mention at the Weekly Shōnen Magazines Rookie Award in 2000, allowing him to serialize School Rumble.

He stated to an audience at Honolulu's 2006 Kawaii Kon convention that he started writing the series because he found the idea of a manga involving a delinquent falling in love interesting. His favorite character, Kenji Harima, is based largely on an amalgam of various friends, although he estimates "about 30%" of Harima is a reflection of himself. However, despite putting most of his personal feelings into the female characters, he stated that Ryuhei Suga, a minor supporting character, is the most autobiographical. Most of the other characters are based on memories of former high-school classmates; Kobayashi recalled that he had no real idea of their voices when drawing them, and it was not until much later, when he heard the voice actors' interpretations during the production of the anime series, that he knew how they should sound. He acknowledged that some characters are more developed than others; in reply to a fan question about the mysterious Akira Takano, he admitted that, despite the closeness he feels for her, he did not put much emphasis on Takano and planned to develop her love-life slowly. Kobayashi intentionally centered his story arcs around misunderstandings which he then resolves, since he believes "if there's no misunderstanding then there's no funny story." He claims that none of his stories are based on real-life events, although when pressed admits the possibility of some resemblances but without divulging specific details.

He has made some cameo appearances in the anime adaptation School Rumble, supplying the voice of Sailor F in two episodes of the first season, and being the narrator of the prehistoric segment in the first OVA, School Rumble - First Term Extra.

After completing School Rumble, he said "School Rumble is an important piece that I want to draw more, but I wanted to do more other things so I ended it. When I have some time, I would like to draw their adult days in a seinen magazine."

Works

Manga

Serials

Short stories

Anime

End Card Illustrations
Pani Poni Dash!, ep 21, 2005
Hidamari Sketch × 365, ep 11, 2008
ef - a tale of melodies., ep 8, 2009
Maria Holic, ep 2, 2009
Bakemonogatari, ep 3, 2009
Dance in the Vampire Bund, ep 2, 2010
Hanamaru Kindergarten, ep 1, 2010
Arakawa Under the Bridge*2, ep 1, 2010
Puella Magi Madoka Magica, ep 4, 2011

Visual Novel

Artbook

References

External links

  
 

Manga artists from Chiba Prefecture
1977 births
People from Chiba Prefecture
Living people
Keio University alumni